Max Antony Whitlock  (born 13 January 1993) is a British artistic gymnast. With fourteen medals and six titles in Olympic and world championships, Whitlock is the most successful gymnast in his nation's history, and the most successful pommel horse worker in gymnastics history; he has 8 global medals in the apparatus, including 5 global gold medals (two Olympic gold, 3 World gold). He is a six-time Olympic medalist (all-round, team, floor exercise and three times on his signature piece, pommel horse), winning three golds and three bronzes, and a five time world medalist on the pommel horse with three gold and two silvers.

Whitlock became the UK's first ever Olympic gold medalist in artistic gymnastics when he won both the men's floor and pommel horse exercises at the 2016 Summer Olympics. He is the only British gymnast to win gold medals at the World Championships, World Cup, European Championships, Commonwealth Games and Olympic Games.

Personal life
Whitlock was born in Hemel Hempstead, Hertfordshire, on 13 January 1993.

He was introduced to gymnastics by a friend from a swimming club when he was seven and joined the Sapphire School of Gymnastics in Hemel Hempstead. When he was twelve, his coach Klemen Bedenik returned to Slovenia, and Whitlock followed him to Maribor to continue training. He returned three months later and joined South Essex Gymnastics Club in Basildon, where he is currently coached by his brother-in-law Scott Hann. Whitlock's wife, Leah, has also worked as an artistic gymnastics coach at the South Essex Gymnastics Club.

Whitlock attended Longdean School in Hemel Hempstead, a non-selective coeducational school within the state education system.

Whitlock married Leah Hickton in July 2017.  The following year, they set up the Max Whitlock Gymnastics Club with locations in Colchester and Southend. Their first child, a daughter named Willow, was born on 23 February 2019.

In January 2020 Whitlock's book The Whitlock Workout: Get Fit and Healthy in Minutes was published by Headline.

Senior career

2010 
In April, Whitlock won gold on pommel horse and floor and was placed second all-around at the 2010 Junior European Championships held in Birmingham.

In October, he was part of the team that won the silver medal for England in the gymnastics in the men's artistic all-around team event at the 2010 Commonwealth Games. He also won the silver medal in the men's pommel horse and a bronze medal in the men's horizontal bar.

2011 
Whitlock was an alternate for the British men's team at the 2011 World Artistic Gymnastics Championships in Tokyo, Japan.

2012 
In May, Whitlock was part of the team that won Gold in the European Championships in Montpellier. This was the first time the British men's team had won a Team Gold, beating both Russia and Romania. He also qualified for the Pommel Horse final, where he finished in 6th place.

Whitlock was a member of Britain's gymnastics team at the 2012 Summer Olympics in London, where he helped the team claim a bronze medal at the team final on 30 July 2012 at the North Greenwich Arena. This was the first time the men's team had won a medal since 1912. He also claimed the bronze medal in the pommel event final, once again beating the 2011 world silver medallist, Cyril Tommasone, with a score of 15.600, with Hungary's Krisztián Berki taking gold with the same score as Whitlock's GB teammate Louis Smith, but winning the gold on account of a higher execution rating.

2013
Whitlock competed at the 2013 European Championships on 19 April 2013. Whitlock won a medal of each colour: a silver in the individual all-around competition, with a total score of 89.106 points behind Russian gold medalist David Belyavskiy; a gold medal in the floor exercise with 15.333; and a bronze medal in the pommel horse with 15.500.

He also competed at the World Championships in Antwerp, Belgium, where he place second on pommel horse.

2014
Between 19–25 May 2014, at the 2014 European Championships in Sofia. Whitlock, with his four Great Britain teammates, took Team silver medal behind Russia with a total score of 262.087 points. In event finals, Whitlock won the gold medal in pommel horse (16.166) ahead of 2012 Olympic champion Krisztián Berki.

At the 2014 Commonwealth Games, Whitlock, with his four England teammates, took Team gold with a score of 266.804 points. In the artistic individual all-around, Whitlock won the gold medal with a score of 90.631 points. Whitlock won his third gold in the Men's Floor final with a score of 15.533. He took silver in the Pommel Horse final with a score of 15.966 and bronze in the parallel bars final.

Whitlock was chosen to compete for Great Britain at 2014 World Artistic Gymnastics Championships in Nanning, China. He had a difficult time in qualifications, with a fall on Floor Exercise and costly errors on Pommel Horse. He did not qualify for any of the individual finals, including the All Around due to the two per country rule as he qualified behind teammates Daniel Purvis and Nile Wilson. After the team competition, Wilson pulled out of the All Around competition due to a wrist injury, allowing Whitlock to replace him in the final. He won the silver medal with a score of 90.473, just under a point and a half behind Kohei Uchimura who scored 91.965 to win his fifth World All-Around Championship.

2015
Whitlock competed at the English Championships in March as the defending all-around champion. He won gold on pommel horse with a score of 16.4 but struggled significantly on the other events and did not compete on vault, his last event.

Due to illness, he only competed on pommel horse at the British Championships, where he won the silver medal behind Louis Smith. After the competition Whitlock was found to have been suffering from glandular fever. Despite this, Whitlock was chosen to compete at the European Championships in Montpellier on the floor and pommel horse. However he did not qualify for any event finals.

After the Championships, his coach announced Whitlock would take a break from training to recover, during which he also cancelled any public appearances and stopped using social media. In May, Whitlock announced on his Twitter he had returned to training.

Whitlock competed as part of the British men's team for the 2015 World Artistic Gymnastics Championships in Glasgow, Scotland. After some minor mistakes in the qualification rounds, he tied for a place in the final with teammate Nile Wilson, but with the tiebreaker rules applied, Whitlock won the place to the individual all-around final. The men's team, which included team captain Kristian Thomas, Daniel Purvis, Louis Smith, Brinn Bevan, Nile Wilson and alternate James Hall, became the first British men's team to win a medal in the all-around team competition at a World Championships, winning a silver behind Japan. Whitlock and Purvis competed well in the Individual All-Round final. A fall on the High Bar kept Whitlock out of the medals, but he finished strongly on the Floor to gain a place in the top 8. He also posted the highest score on the pommel horse out of all the competitors - 16.100. On 31 October Whitlock competed in the Floor and pommel horse finals. He won the silver medal on floor behind world champion Kenzo Shirai, and later in the afternoon became the first British man ever to win a World Championship gold medal, with a score of 16.133 on the pommel horse. His teammate Louis Smith won the silver medal with a score of 16.033.

2016
Whitlock competed at the Glasgow World Cup on 12 March 2016. He won the all around with 89.299. Whitlock gained the highest scores of the competition on floor and pommel horse, and came second on vault and high bar.

In May, Whitlock withdrew from the Great Britain squad for the European Championships in Bern, Switzerland due to a virus.

On 12 July 2016, Whitlock was selected for Great Britain's 2016 Olympic gymnastic team, along with Louis Smith, Nile Wilson, Kristian Thomas and Brinn Bevan. He won a bronze medal in the all-round gymnastics event, Great Britain's first in this Olympic event for 108 years. He later went on to win the gold in the individual floor exercise, becoming the first British gymnast to win an individual gold. Within two hours he won a second gold in the individual pommel horse.

2017
At the 2017 Artistic Gymnastics World Championships in Montreal, Whitlock became the first British gymnast to successfully defend a world title when he took victory in the pommel horse.

2018
At the 2018 Commonwealth Games, Whitlock was part of the team that won gold in the team event. However, he failed to defend his individual titles in the Games; he sat out the individual all-around competition, finished 6th on the floor, winning only a silver on the pommel horse, the first time he had not won gold on this apparatus since 2015.

At the 2018 European Championships in Glasgow, Whitlock won a silver as part of the team. However, an error in his routine on the pommel horse lost him an individual medal in the event.

At the 2018 World Championships in Doha, Qatar, Whitlock failed to win a third consecutive pommel gold at the World Championship, despite receiving the same score of 15.166 as the winner Xiao Ruoteng. He finished in second place due to a lower execution mark.

2019
After failing to win gold at the European Championships in 2018, Whitlock regained his gold on pommel horse at the  2019 European Artistic Gymnastics Championships held in Szczecin, Poland.

At the 2019 World Artistic Gymnastics Championships held in Stuttgart, Whitlock recovered from an early mistake to win his third world gold on pommel horse.

2021 
Whitlock competed at the European Championships in Basel, Switzerland.

At the 2020 Summer Olympics in Tokyo, Japan, Whitlock competed for Great Britain. The team took fourth place with a score of 255.76. Whitlock opted not to defend the floor exercise title, concentrating instead on the pommel horse. He went on to win the Olympic gold medal on the pommel horse with a score of 15.583. The win gave him two Olympic titles and three World titles, and he became the most successful gymnast ever on pommel horse.

Awards and honours

In 2015 Whitlock received the Prize for Elegance at the 2015 World Championships in Glasgow, Scotland.  In, 2019 he was named British Gymnastics Most Outstanding Athlete of the Year.

Whitlock was appointed Member of the Order of the British Empire (MBE) in the 2017 New Year Honours for services to gymnastics and Officer of the Order of the British Empire (OBE) in the 2022 New Year Honours, also for services to gymnastics.

In February 2021 Whitlock was announced as an ambassador for the 2022 World Championships in Liverpool, England.

Competitive history

References

External links

 Max Whitlock at British Gymnastics
 
 
 

1993 births
Living people
Sportspeople from Hemel Hempstead
Commonwealth Games silver medallists for England
Commonwealth Games bronze medallists for England
British male artistic gymnasts
Gymnasts at the 2012 Summer Olympics
Gymnasts at the 2016 Summer Olympics
Olympic gymnasts of Great Britain
Olympic gold medallists for Great Britain
Olympic bronze medallists for Great Britain
Olympic medalists in gymnastics
Medalists at the 2012 Summer Olympics
Medalists at the 2016 Summer Olympics
Gymnasts at the 2010 Commonwealth Games
Gymnasts at the 2014 Commonwealth Games
Gymnasts at the 2018 Commonwealth Games
Commonwealth Games gold medallists for England
Commonwealth Games medallists in gymnastics
World champion gymnasts
Medalists at the World Artistic Gymnastics Championships
Officers of the Order of the British Empire
Gymnasts at the 2020 Summer Olympics
Medalists at the 2020 Summer Olympics
Medallists at the 2010 Commonwealth Games
Medallists at the 2014 Commonwealth Games
Medallists at the 2018 Commonwealth Games